Page Blakeslee Walley (born March 2, 1957) is a psychologist, businessman, Baptist minister and Republican politician from Bolivar, Tennessee.

Background 
Walley was born March 2, 1957, in Chattanooga and grew up in La Grange. He received a bachelor's degree in psychology from Davidson College and his master's and doctorate degrees in clinical psychology from the University of Georgia. He married the former Teresa Anne McVay in Miami on June 21, 1985.

Public life 
Walley served in the Tennessee House of Representatives from 1991 to 2000 (the 97th, 98th, 99th, 100th and 101st General Assemblies). He began his term in the House by defeating incumbent Democrat Robert S. Stallings by 220 votes. He left the House in 2000, becoming Commissioner of the Tennessee Department of Children's Services (which he had helped create), and was succeeded  by Democrat Johnny Shaw (also a psychologist, businessman, and Baptist minister). He later left Tennessee, heading the Alabama Department of Children’s Affairs and their Department of Human Services.

Back to Tennessee 
Returning to Tennessee, he settled in Bolivar (near La Grange) and went back into practice as a clinical psychologist and public speaker. He also served on the city council and as Vice Mayor of Bolivar. He was elected in 2020 to represent the 26th District of the Tennessee State Senate, succeeding fellow Republican Dolores Gresham (who did not seek re-election). Walley defeated Jai Templeton in the Republican primary for District 26 on August 6, 2020, with 13,076 votes to 11,543 for Templeton. In the November general election, he won with 62,701 votes to 19,918 for Democratic nominee Civil Miller-Watkins.

References 

1957 births
Living people
Republican Party members of the Tennessee House of Representatives
People from Bolivar, Tennessee
Republican Party Tennessee state senators
People from Chattanooga, Tennessee
American clinical psychologists